Joy S. Burns was the president and CEO of the D.C. Burns Realty and Trust Company and the owner of the Burnsley Hotel. She was involved in the Denver, Colorado, community and served on a number of boards, including the Denver Metro Convention and Visitor's Bureau; Sportswomen of Colorado, Inc.; the Denver Center for the Performing Arts; and the Metropolitan Football Stadium District. Burns was also a founder of the Colorado Women's Foundation and of the Colorado Business Bank. She was inducted into the Colorado Business Hall of Fame in 1998, the Colorado Tourism and Travel Hall of Fame in 1999, and the Colorado Women's Hall of Fame in 2000.

Burns' work with the University of Denver started in 1972 when she began volunteering with the Women's Library Association. In 1981, she joined the board of trustees. Nine years later she became chairman of the board, becoming the first woman to hold the post. She has been a trustee for 30 years and supported the Joy Burns Arena at the Ritchie Center and the Joy Burns Plaza in the Newman Center for the Performing Arts. In addition, she supports the Franklin L. Burns School of Real Estate and Construction Management, named after her late husband. Burns was inducted into the University of Denver Athletic Hall of Fame in 1997. She was also the recipient of the 2005 DU Josef Korbel Humanitarian Award and the 2008 award for Distinguished Service to the university.

Burns died in 2020 at age 92.

References

University of Denver:

Links
http://www.coloradobusinesshalloffame.org/franklin-and-joy-burns.html
http://www.bizjournals.com/search?q=Joy+S+Burns
https://web.archive.org/web/20150626114459/http://daniels.du.edu/faculty-research/franklin-l-burns-school-of-real-estate-and-construction-management/history-of-burns/
http://www.bloomberg.com/research/stocks/private/person.asp?personId=62730518&privcapId=4181445&previousCapId=295224&previousTitle=PIONEER%20NATURAL%20RESOURCES%20CO
http://www.historycolorado.org/sites/default/files/files/OAHP/Guides/Builders_Franklin_Burns.pdf

People from Denver
Living people
American women chief executives
Year of birth missing (living people)
21st-century American women